Vily may refer to:

Vily, Malagasy common name for species in the fish genus Eleotris
Vily, Malagasy common name for the fish Teramulus kieneri, 
Vily, a plural of vila (fairy)

See also
 Vili (disambiguation)